Alicia Plaza Tariffi, born April 30, 1957 in Caracas, Venezuela, is a Venezuelan actress. She has worked in various telenovelas, and most recently she has participated in various productions in Miami, Florida.

Filmography

Films 
 1979    El rebaño de los ángeles
 1982: Mosquita muerta
 1984: Adiós Miami
 1983: La casa de agua
 1985: El atentado
 1998: 100 años de perdón : Rita
 Atenea y Afrodita
 2006: Chao Cristina (RCTV) :  Lucía

Telenovelas 
 1979: Rosángela (Venevisión) : Rosita
 1982: ¿Qué pasó con Jacqueline? (RCTV)
 1982: Jugando a vivir (RCTV) : Eloísa Peña
 1983: Bienvenida Esperanza (RCTV) : Meliza Acuña
 1985: La graduación de un delincuente
 1990: Pobre diabla (CANAL 13) : Bárbara
 1992: Por estas calles (RCTV)
 1994: Alejandra (RCTV) : Morella
 1995: Ilusiones
 1996: Los amores de Anita Peña (RCTV)
 1998: Reina de corazones (RCTV) : Virtudes
 2000: Hay amores que matan (RCTV) : Mónica de Montenegro
 2001: La soberana (RCTV) : Rosa Ozores
 2002: Trapos íntimos (RCTV) : Beba Solís
 2004: Negra consentida (RCTV) : Herminia Meaño de Nascimiento
 2006: Mi vida eres tú (Telemundo) : Adela
 2007: Acorralada (Venevisión) : Bruna Pérez
 2007-2008: Pecados ajenos (Venevisión) : Mónica Rojas
 2009: Un esposo para Estela (Venevisión) : Priscila

References

External links

1957 births
Actresses from Caracas
Venezuelan film actresses
Venezuelan telenovela actresses
Living people